The Cincinnati Flying Pig Marathon is an annual  race run the first Sunday of May in Cincinnati, Ohio.  First held in 1999, it is the 3rd-largest first-time marathon in the United States.  The marathon had nearly 5000 finishers in 2008, and total participation for all weekend events exceeded 30,408 in 2011.  The race starts and finishes downtown and also crosses into Northern Kentucky.  It is a qualifying race for the Boston Marathon.

History 

The marathon was first held in 1999.

In 2002, overall female winner Tatyana Pozdnyakova set the course record with a finish time of 2:34:35.

In 2006, overall male winner Cecil Franke set the course record with a finish time of 2:20:25.

In 2011, legally blind runner Amy McDonaugh won the race in the women's division without a guide and with a time of 2:58:14.

In 2020, the race was cancelled due to the coronavirus pandemic, with all registrants given the option of either running the race virtually or transferring their entry to a later year.

Course 
The race course starts in downtown Cincinnati and crosses the Taylor-Southgate Bridge over the Ohio River into Northern Kentucky, where it travels through Newport and crosses westward over the Licking River via the Fourth Street Bridge into Covington. From Covington, the route takes the Clay Wade Bailey Bridge back over the Ohio River into Cincinnati. The race course then makes its way east through East Walnut Hills, O'Bryonville, and Hyde Park and ends after  at Richards Industries on Wasson Road. The third leg goes east to the village of Mariemont before looping back to head towards the river; it ends in Linwood, having traversed . The last  of the fourth leg follow the Ohio River Scenic Byway (US 52) along the Ohio River, heading downtown toward the finish line.

Other races 
In recent years, the Flying Pig has included a 5K race, a 10K race, and a half marathon and a 2-mile "Flying Fur" event for dogs and humans. The 5K and 10K are held on the day before the marathon. The half marathon starts and finishes at the same locations as the full marathon, and is held on the same day as the full marathon.

Winners 
Marathon - 2000 - Rudolph Jun — Czech Republic — 2:23:04

Marathon - 2000 - Rebecca Gallaher - Mississippi - 2:49:32

Wheeler - 2000 - Franz Nietlispach - Leimgasse - 1:35:59

Wheeler - 2000 - Holly Koester - Bedford, Massachusetts - 3:17:41

See also
Big Pig Gig
Flying pig

Notes

References

External links
Official site
Past results and reviews

Marathons in the United States
Sports competitions in Cincinnati
1999 establishments in Ohio
Recurring sporting events established in 1999
Annual sporting events in the United States
May events